HD 108236 is a G-type main-sequence star. Its surface temperature is 5660 K. HD 108236 is severely depleted in heavy elements compared to the Sun, with a metallicity Fe/H index of −0.28 (52% of the Solar System), and is probably older than the Sun at 6.7 billion years.

According to WISE mission data, the star was suspected to be surrounded by a debris disk, but a reanalysis of the data rejected the debris disk hypothesis by 2014. The reason for the false positive was contamination from a nearby infrared source.

Planetary system

In 2020, four planets orbiting HD 108236 were discovered by the transit method, followed by another one in 2021.

References

Centaurus (constellation)
Planetary transit variables
G-type main-sequence stars
Planetary systems with five confirmed planets
J12261789-5121462
CD-50 6971
060689
108236